Nevio Marasović (born 7 July  1983) is a Croatian film director and screenwriter, and also a commercial director.

Biography 

He made his first feature film called The Computer Repairment at the age of sixteen.

He graduated film directing at the Academy of Dramatic Arts in Zagreb.
In 2005 he made a ghost commercial “Durex Lunch” which won numerous awards at different advertising festivals. “Lunch” also became an Internet meme in the following years.

In 2010 Marasović wrote and directed his feature film The Show Must Go On, set in near-future Zagreb, seven years after the accession of Croatia to the EU, in which there are two depictions - one of the outside world, i.e. the third world war between the EU and unnamed countries, and the other of housemates in a Big Brother-like TV reality show, who are unaware that during their stay in the house a world war has started and who the main character, the producer of the show, decides not to inform, in order to give the viewers a view of the carefree world that once existed before the war broke out.

The Show Must Go On received Golden Arena for Best Screenplay, Golden Arena for the Best Special Effects, Best Newcomer award and the Critic's Choice Movie of the Year award at the Pula Film Festival, Croatia's national film festival.

The same year Marasović made a TV comedy show called Instruktor for Croatia's RTL television.
Along with a Croatian actor Stjepan Perić, Marasović was Instruktor'''s author and writer.

Filmography
 Autobiography (2003)
 Run (2009)
 The Show Must Go On (2010) feature film
 Instructor (2010) comedy show
 Vis-à-Vis (2013)
 Goran (2016)
 Comic Sans'' (2018)

References

External links
 

1983 births
Living people
Croatian film directors
Film people from Zagreb
Croatian screenwriters
Golden Arena winners